The Ton Pariwat Wildlife Sanctuary is located in the north of Mueang Phang Nga district, Phang Nga Province, southern Thailand. It covers an area of 224 square kilometres of forested hills at the southern end of the Phuket mountain range. It is part of a system of protected areas known as the southern forest complex, continued to the northwest by the Khlong Phanom National Park.

Rare species found in the sanctuary include the blue-banded kingfisher (Alcedo euryzona) and the Rafflesia kerrii giant flower. This is also the only home of the Ton Pariwat Stone Oak (Lithocarpus orbicarpus)  known from a single tree found in this park.

References

External links
Ton Pariwat Wildlife Sanctuary'
birdlife.org
The Giant Flower Bua Phut (Rafflesia kerrii)

  
 

Wildlife sanctuaries of Thailand
Tenasserim Hills
Geography of Phang Nga province
Tourist attractions in Phang Nga province